The Scandinavian Peninsula became ice-free around the end of the last ice age. The Nordic Stone Age begins at that time, with the Upper Paleolithic Ahrensburg culture, giving way to the Mesolithic hunter-gatherers by the 7th millennium BC (Maglemosian culture c. 7500–6000 BC, Kongemose culture c. 6000–5200 BC, Ertebølle culture c. 5300–3950 BC). The Neolithic stage is marked by the  Funnelbeaker culture (4000–2700 BC), followed by the Pitted Ware culture (3200–2300 BC).

Around 2800 BC, metal was introduced in Scandinavia in the Corded Ware culture. In much of Scandinavia, a Battle Axe culture became prominent, known from some 3,000 graves. The period 2500–500 BC also left many visible remains to modern times, most notably the many thousands rock carvings (petroglyphs) in western Sweden at Tanumshede and in Norway at Alta. A more advanced culture came with the Nordic Bronze Age (c. 2000/1750–500 BC). It was followed by the Iron Age in the 4th century BC.

Ice age

The pre-history of Scandinavia begins at the end of the Pleistocene epoch, following the last glacial period's receding Fenno-Scandian ice sheet.

Parts of Denmark, Scania and the Norwegian coast line were free from ice around 13,000 BC, and around 10,000 BC the rim of ice was around Dalsland, Västergötland and Östergötland. It wasn't until 7000 BC that all of Svealand and the modern coastal regions of northeastern Sweden were free of ice, although the huge weight of the ice sheet had caused isostatic depression of Fennoscandia, placing large parts of eastern Sweden and western Finland underwater.

In Scandinavia, the time following the last ice age period begins at circa 9500 BC and is called at first the Yoldia Stage, after the Yoldia Sea, then the Ancylus Stage, after the Ancylus Lake in turn named after Ancylus fluviatilis, a small fresh-water gastropod from this time. At this time, Denmark and Sweden were joined and the "Baltic Sea" of the age was a fresh water lake called the Ancylus Lake. The Ancylus age is followed by formation of the Littorina Sea and the Litorina Stage (named after the Littorina littorea mollusc) at around 6200 BC.

With the first human colonization of this new land (the territory of modern Sweden was partly under water though, and with radically different coastlines) during the Ancylus and Litorina ages begins the Nordic Stone Age. In recent years there have been archaeological finds in caves which strongly suggest human inhabitation of Scandinavia before the Weichsel glaciation, at least 50,000 years ago, presumably by Neanderthals.

Stone age

Upper Paleolithic

As the ice receded reindeer grazed on the plains of Denmark and southernmost Sweden. This was the land of the Ahrensburg culture, whose members hunted over territories 100,000 km2 vast and lived in teepees on the tundra. On this land there was little forest but arctic white birch and rowan, but the taiga slowly appeared.

Mesolithic

The Scandinavian peninsula was the last part of Europe to be colonized after the Last Glacial Maximum. The migration routes, cultural networks, and the genetic makeup of the first Scandinavians remain elusive and several hypotheses exist based on archaeology, climate modeling, and genetics. Analysis of genomes of early Scandinavian Hunter-Gatherers (SHGs) from the cave Stora Förvar on Stora Karlsö, Stora Bjers on Gotland, Hummervikholmen in Norway showed that migrations followed two routes: one from the south and another from the northeast along the ice-free Norwegian Atlantic coast. These groups met and mixed in Scandinavia, creating a population more diverse than contemporaneous central and western European hunter-gatherers.

In the 7th millennium BC, when the reindeer and their hunters had moved for northern Scandinavia, forests had been established in the land. A culture called the Maglemosian culture lived in Denmark and southern Sweden, and north of them, in Norway and most of southern Sweden, the Fosna-Hensbacka culture, who lived mostly along the shores of the thriving forests. Utilizing fire, boats and stone tools enabled these Stone Age inhabitants to survive life in northern Europe. The northern hunter/gatherers followed the herds and the salmon runs, moving south during the winters, and moving north again during the summers. These early peoples followed cultural traditions similar to those practiced throughout other regions in the far-north areas, including modern Finland, Russia, and across the Bering Strait into the northernmost strip of North America (containing portions of today's Alaska and Canada)

The Maglemosian people lived in forest and wetland environments using fishing and hunting tools made from wood, bone and flint microliths. A characteristic of the culture are the sharply edged microliths of flintstone which were used for spear heads and arrowheads. Microliths finds are more sparse from c. 6000 BC and the period is said to transit into the Kongemose culture (c. 6000–5200 BC). The finds from this period are characterised by long flintstone flakes which were used for making the characteristic rhombic arrowheads, scrapers, drills, awls and toothed blades.

During the 6th millennium BC, southern Scandinavia was clad in lush forests of temperate broadleaf and mixed forests. In these forests roamed animals such as aurochs, wisent, moose and red deer. Now, the Kongemose culture lived off these animals. Like their predecessors, they also hunted seals and fished in the rich waters. North of the Kongemose people, lived other hunter-gatherers in most of southern Norway and Sweden, called the Nøstvet and Lihult cultures, descendants of the Fosna and Hensbacka cultures. These cultures still hunted, in the end of the 6th millennium BC when the Kongemose culture was replaced by the Ertebølle culture in the south.

Neolithic

During the 5th millennium BC, the Ertebølle culture took up pottery from the Linear Pottery culture in the south, whose members had long cultivated the land and kept animals. About 4000 BC south Scandinavia up to River Dalälven in Sweden became part of the Funnelbeaker culture (4000–2700 BC), a culture that originated in southern parts of Europe and slowly advanced up through today's Uppland, Sweden. Tribes along the coasts of Svealand, Götaland, Åland, northeastern Denmark and southern Norway learnt new technologies that became the Pitted Ware culture (3200–2300 BC). The Pitted Ware culture then developed along Sweden's east coast as a return to a hunting economy in the mid-4th millennium BC (see the Alvastra pile-dwelling).

It is not known what language these early Scandinavians spoke. It might have been similar to Basque, due to the distribution of the monuments by early megalith builders. Towards the end of the 3rd millennium BC, they were overrun by new groups who many scholars think spoke Proto-Indo-European, the Battle-Axe culture. This new people advanced up to Uppland and the Oslofjord, and they probably provided the language that was the ancestor of the modern Scandinavian languages. This new culture had the battle axe as a status symbol, and were cattle herders. However, soon a new invention would arrive, that would usher in a time of cultural advance in Scandinavia, the Bronze Age.

Bronze Age

During the Nordic Bronze Age from c. 1700–500 BC, an advanced civilization appears in Denmark, parts of Sweden and parts of Norway. They manufactured bronze tools and weapons as well as jewellery and artifacts of bronze and gold. All the bronze and gold was imported and it has been assumed that the civilization was founded in amber trade, through contacts with Central European and Mediterranean cultures.

The period between 2300 and 500 BC was the most intensive petroglyph-carving period in Scandinavia, with carvings depicting agricultural activities, animals, nature, hunts, ships, ceremonies, warfare, etc.. Petroglyphs with themes of a sexual nature have also been found in Bohuslän, dating from 800 to 500 BC.

Iron Age

See also the separate articles on the Pre-Roman Iron Age, the Vendel Age, and the Roman Iron Age

Tacitus (about 98 AD) described a nation called "Suiones" living on an island in the Ocean. These Suiones had ships that were peculiar because they had a prow in both ends (the shape we recognise as Viking ships). This word Suiones is the same name as in Anglo-Saxon Sweon whose country in Angle-Saxon was called Sweoland (Svealand). In Beowulf, this tribe is also called Sweoðeod, from which the name Sweden is derived, and the country has the name Sweorice, which is an old form, in Old English (Anglo-Saxon), of the present Swedish name for Sweden.

In the 6th century the Ostrogoth Jordanes mentioned a tribe named Suehans which is the same name as Tacitus' Suiones. He also unwittingly described the same tribe by a different name, the Suetidi which is the same as an old name for Sweden, Svíþjóð and the English Sweoðeod.

Several sources, such as Beowulf, Ynglingatal, Ynglinga saga, Saxo Grammaticus and Historia Norwegiae, mention a number of Swedish kings who lived in the 6th century, such as Eadgils, Ohthere and Onela, as well as a number of Geatish kings. Some of these kings were in all likelihood historic kings, although the sources sometimes give contradictory information, such as the death of Ottar. See Mythological kings of Sweden and Semi-legendary kings of Sweden.

In those days the kings were warlords rather than kings as we understand that title today, and what was to become Sweden, Norway and Denmark in a modern sense, were a number of petty kingdoms whose borders changed constantly as the kings killed each other, and had the local assemblies accept them as kings. The politics of these early kingdoms are retold in Beowulf (see e.g. the semi-legendary Swedish-Geatish wars) and the Norse sagas.

One of the most powerful kings was the Swedish king who according to early sources only ruled what is today eastern Svealand. It is unknown when it happened and it probably happened several times, but when sources become more reliable the territories of the Swedish kings include Västergötland and other parts of Götaland. This stage is by some considered to be the beginning of Sweden, as we know it today.

See also
 Sami history
 Prehistoric Sweden

References

 Weibull, Curt, 1922: Sveriges och Danmarks äldsta historia – en orientering, CWK Gleerups förlag, Lund.

Prehistoric
 

History of Finland by period
Scandinavia
Archaeology of Denmark
Archaeology of Finland
Archaeology of Norway
Archaeology of Sweden